The Bowers Fly Baby is a homebuilt, single-seat, open-cockpit, wood and fabric low-wing monoplane that was designed by famed United States aircraft designer and Boeing historian, Peter M. Bowers.

Development
The prototype Fly Baby first flew in 1962, becoming the winner of the Experimental Aircraft Association's 1962 design competition.

Variants include a biplane version called the Bowers Bi-Baby or Fly Baby 1-B, a floatplane version, and several dual-cockpit designs by various builders. Bowers also designed a side-by-side two-seat version he called Namu II, but few examples have been built.

Over 500 Fly Babies have been completed to date, with scores still flying worldwide and an active network of builders and owners. It is built from plans and was designed to be constructed in a garage using only basic hand tools, by a person of average "home handyman" skill in 1962. The plans consist of over one hundred pages of typewritten instructions and dimensioned drawings. After Bowers' death in 2003 the plans were unavailable for a time, but starting in 2007 they were back on the market, sold by the Bowers family.

Design
To win the 1962 Experimental Aircraft Association (EAA) Design Contest, Bowers designed the small plane to meet EAA's criteria for a low-cost, folding-wing airplane that was easy to build and fly, and could be towed or trailered.

The Fly Baby was designed to be a very simple aircraft. For example, the fuel gauge is a stiff wire attached to a float poking up through the gas cap (a common application in the 1930s and 1940s, as seen on Piper and Aeronca light aircraft).  The structure is of aircraft-grade spruce and plywood (Bowers did not advocate skimping on the quality of structural wood), covered with doped aircraft fabric. Aileron controls are push-tube, elevator controls are a combination of push-tube and cable, the rudder is cable-controlled.

Although it is not intended for intense aerobatics, the Fly Baby can reportedly be flown through spins, simple loops, and barrel rolls.

The Fly Baby's wings fold up against the fuselage enabling it to be stored in a single-car garage or a car trailer. The wings can be folded or unfolded in about 15 minutes.  The airplane was designed to be stored in a garage and towed to the airport on its own gear. In practice, most owners use a trailer or keep their Fly Baby hangared at an airport.

The landing gear is fixed and unsprung.  The main landing gear struts are made of laminated wood with a steel axle. The only shock absorption comes from the tires themselves. (Some have been modified from, the original  design, to use shock-absorbing, spring-steel landing gear legs.) Hydraulic wheel brakes are usually fitted. 

The aircraft was designed to be powered by a 65-horsepower (48 kW) Continental A-65 piston engine taken from a Piper Cub.  Engines of up to 100 horsepower (75 kW) have been fitted, including the Continental O-200 and converted Corvair automotive conversions.

While the instrumentation installed is up to the builder, most Fly Babys are equipped for visual flight rules (VFR) only.  An electrical system is optional; many Fly Baby owners hand-prop the engine for starting, and use a handheld radio.

Some of the components used, such as the fuel tank and engine, were designed to be taken from the Piper Cub, which were cheap and plentiful in 1962. Even today, the total cost of construction can be under US$10,000.

Variants

Bowers Bi-Baby
A Fly Baby can be converted to a biplane Bi-Baby in less than one hour by adding the struts and upper wing to the existing aircraft (if the fittings were built in) or it can be built as a biplane version from the start.

Regulations

United States
In the United States of America the FAA categorizes the Fly Baby  as an Experimental Amateur-Built aircraft.  It also fits the FAA's specifications for a Light Sport Aircraft and can be flown in the US by pilots holding a Recreational Pilot or Sport Pilot certificate.

Canada
In Canada the Fly Baby may be built as an amateur-built aircraft or as a basic ultra-light aeroplane. It may be flown with an Ultra-light Pilot Permit or higher aeroplane licence.

Specifications (Fly Baby)

See also

Comparable aircraft
Ameri-Cana Eureka
Murphy JDM-8
Hanson Woodwind, Scott Ol' Ironsides - Construction methods based on Bower's Fly Baby plans.

References

External links

Photo of the prototype Fly Baby in flight
Digitized Bowers Fly Baby Model 1A Builders Manual at The Museum of Flight

Homebuilt aircraft
1960s United States civil utility aircraft
Light-sport aircraft
Low-wing aircraft
Bowers aircraft
Single-engined tractor aircraft
Aircraft first flown in 1962